Takalani Ndlovu (born 11 January 1978), is a South African professional boxer with orthodox stance who goes by the nickname of "Panther".

Pro career
He won the IBF junior featherweight title against Canadian Steve Molitor on 26 March 2011.

Professional boxing record

External links
 

|-

1978 births
Living people
Sportspeople from Soweto
Zulu people
Super-bantamweight boxers
International Boxing Federation champions
South African male boxers